James Sykes Battye (1871–1954) was an Australian librarian who was the first chief librarian of the Victoria Public Library in Perth, Western Australia.  He was a leading historian, librarian and public figure in Western Australian and also served as a Chancellor of the University of Western Australia.

In 1951, The West Australian newspaper designated him as the Principal librarian and secretary of the Public Library, Museum and Art Gallery of Western Australia

Battye Street in the Canberra suburb of Bruce is named in his honour.

Biography
James Sykes Battye was born at Geelong, Victoria, on 20 November 1871. His father Daniel Battye, was a wool-weaver from Yorkshire in England.
His mother was Maria, (née Quamby).

He married Sarah Elizabeth May in Melbourne on 15 May 1895.

Battye came to Western Australia from Victoria in 1894 to take up the position which he held until his death in 1954.

Although not directly within his professional role, he developed a strong interest in Western Australian history and began collecting material from early in the century.

Battye died on 15 July 1954.

The J S Battye Library is named in his honour. "Battye" is a local term for the library and also his History of Western Australia volume published at the time of the Western Australia centenary celebrations in 1929.

Published works
Battye was involved in a number of publishing projectsthe Cyclopedia of Western Australia before the First World War, and the History of Western Australia, as well as the commemoration of the state's centenary in 1929 he was involved in the organising committee.

  Facsimile edition published in 1985 by Hesperian Press, Carlisle, W.A. .

See also

Western Australia Post Office Directory
State Records Office of Western Australia

References

Further reading
Cyclopedia of Western Australia - has his biography until 1912 at - Vol. 1, pp. 532–533
 Garrick, P. (1984) Two historians and the aborigines: Kimberly and Battye, commentary on their different attitudes. Studies in Western Australian History, No.8 (Dec. 1984), pp. 111–130

External links 
 Works by J S Battye at Project Gutenberg Australia

Historians from Western Australia
1871 births
1954 deaths
University of Western Australia chancellors
People from Geelong
Australian librarians